Paul Damian Cross, OAM (born 10 February 1979)  is an Australian swimmer with an intellectual disability. He was born in Brisbane, Queensland. He competed at the 1996 Summer Paralympics in two events. At the 2000 Sydney Games, he competed in eight events and won a gold medal in the Men's 4 × 100 m Freestyle S14 swimming event, for which he received a Medal of the Order of Australia. In 2000, he received an Australian Sports Medal. In 1999, he was an Australian Institute of Sport Athlete with a Disability scholarship holder.

At the 1998 Christchurch IPC Swimming World Championships, he won silver medals in Men's 50m Butterfly and Men's 200m Individual Medley.

References

Male Paralympic swimmers of Australia
Paralympic gold medalists for Australia
Swimmers at the 1996 Summer Paralympics
Swimmers at the 2000 Summer Paralympics
Recipients of the Medal of the Order of Australia
Recipients of the Australian Sports Medal
Australian Institute of Sport Paralympic swimmers
Living people
1979 births
Medalists at the 2000 Summer Paralympics
Paralympic medalists in swimming
Australian male butterfly swimmers
Australian male medley swimmers
Australian male freestyle swimmers
S14-classified Paralympic swimmers
Medalists at the World Para Swimming Championships